A tricycle is a non-motorized vehicle with three wheels.

Tricycle may also refer to:

Vehicles with three wheels
 Motorized tricycle, resembling a bicycle with two rear wheels and an engine
 Tricycle landing gear, an aircraft undercarriage configuration

Other uses
 Tricycle (album), by Daniel Bélanger, 1999
 "Tricycle" (song), by Psapp, 2006
 Tricycle (spy) or Duško Popov (1912–1981), Serbian World War II triple agent
 Tricycle: The Buddhist Review, an American quarterly magazine
 Tricycle Press, an American children's publishing imprint
 Tricycle Theatre, in London, England

See also
 Tricicle, Catalan comic mime troupe
 Three-wheeler
 Three-wheeled vehicle (disambiguation)
 Trike (disambiguation)